The Bank Krajowy, full name Bank Krajowy dla Królestwa Galicji i Lodomerii wraz z Wielkim Księstwem Krakowskim, was a government-owned financial institution, established in 1881 by the Diet of Galicia and Lodomeria in Lemberg, now Lviv. In 1920, its seat was relocated to Warsaw and its name changed to Polski Bank Krajowy. In 1924, it was merged into the newly created Bank Gospodarstwa Krajowego.

History

The Bank Krajowy was the first credit institution in Galicia that emerged outside of the Jewish community, leaving aside direct loans provided by large landowners.

In 1895, the Bank Krajowy opened a branch in Kraków. In 1905, it moved into a new purpose-built head office adjacent to the Galician Diet building in Lemberg (which later became the main building of the University of Lviv). In 1910, it opened another branch in Bielsko-Biała, for which it erected a new building designed by architect Leopold Landau in the early 1920s. By then, it was the dominant credit institution in Galicia, partly substituting the Austro-Hungarian Bank. It lent to local government and public institutions, and thus financed public investments such as railways and tramways. It also discounted commercial bills, lent to small landowners, and collected retail deposits. 

During World War I, its headquarters was temporarily relocated to Vienna. In 1920, Bank Krajowy became property of the newly established government of the Second Polish Republic, which relocated its head office to Warsaw and renamed it . By then, it had added branches in Stanisławów (later Ivano-Frankivsk), Przemyśl, Drohobycz, and Kolomyia to the prior ones in Kraków and Biała.

In 1924, at the initiative of Prime Minister Władysław Grabski, Bank Krajowy merged with the State Reconstruction Bank (based in Warsaw) and the Bank for Cities in Lesser Poland to form Bank Gospodarstwa Krajowego.

Leadership

Chairmen
 Hipolit Bochdan (1882–1908)
  (1908–1913) 
  (1913–1919)
  (1919-1922)
 Jan Kanty Steczkowski (1922-1924)

Directors
  (1882–1888)
  (1888–1913) 
 Jan Kanty Steczkowski (1913–1920)

See also
 Zemská Banka, formerly 
 Landesbank für Bosnien und Herzegowina
 Landesbank

Notes

Defunct banks of Poland
Defunct banks of Ukraine